John Campbell-Mac (born in Canning Town, East London, England and is an actor and producer based in Hollywood, California.

Early life
John Campbell-Mac was brought up by his grand parents William and Mary Campbell. The family moved from Canning Town in East London to Colchester in Essex when John was the age of 5. After being bullied as a child he was encouraged by his grandfather to take up boxing and boxed for the Castle Colchester Boxing Club. He won the award for best prospect in his first competitive season and later became club champion eventually moving back to London to forward his career.

His acting talent first came to the attention of his school teachers where he was given regularly main character in school plays and later in amateur theatre productions. Upon leaving school, he worked in construction, as a physical fitness instructor, model, dancer and as a professional boxer and continued his training in martial arts including Muay Thai (Thai boxing), karate and taekwondo.

He trained at the City Literature Institute, the Impulse Theatre Company and the Actors' Centre, London. After moving to Hollywood in 2010 he worked with Ivana Chubbuck Studio, Marjie Haber and Bob Corf.

Career
John Campbell-Mac has been working consistently as an actor since 1995 in many leading and supporting roles. He is often cast as a lovable rogue, tough guy but is at his best when playing comedy.

He has appeared in many films, including 31 North 62 East alongside John Rhys-Davies and Marina Sirtis, "Visible Scars" with Tom Sizemore and Hit The Big Time with Jason Lee Hyde.

He received positive reviews for the movie Winner Takes All where he acted in the lead role, a film he also wrote and produced. The film was nominated for a BAFTA Award, and was included in the official selection for over 40 festivals worldwide.

John attended the Cannes Film Festival in 2009 to help promote three films that he was starring in showing there, including the multi award-winning 45 and Left Holding Baby and the political thriller 31 North 62 East.
 
He relocated to Hollywood in 2010 although he still has a base in London.

He wrote and produced the TV series Futch Tube and played one of the leading roles in the improv TV series L.A Paranormal for Koldcast TV. He also played the lead in the comedy Hit the Big Time filmed in Hollywood, Las Vegas, London and Utah. He played in a British gangster feature Butterflies and Bullets.

John puts in an appearance at the start of his brother Chico Slimani's music video (Curvy Cola Bottle Body) as a journalist. He also appears as a comedy fighter in the Professor Green video "A Hard Night Out".

Filmography

Producer
2004: Winner Takes All (producer)
2007: Left Holding Baby (executive producer) (producer)
2009: Three Pints of Beer (2009) (producer)
2009: 45 (producer)
2009: A Geek Walks into a Pub (producer)
2009: Hit the Big Time (2009) (producer)
2011: Futch Tube (TV series, producer)
2021 Green Rush The Ultimate Strain (Producer)

Writer
2004: Winner Takes All (writer)
2007: Left Holding Baby (writer)
2009: Three Pints of Beer (screenplay)
2009: A Geek Walks into a Pub (screenplay)
2009: Hit the Big Time (screenplay)
2011: 'Futch Tube' (Writer) (Screenplay)
2011: L.A Paranormal (Screenplay)
2021 Green Rush The Ultimate Strain (Writer)

Actor
1995: Porkpie .... Jo (TV series, in episode "Why Me")
1997: Family Affairs .... Troy (TV series, 1 episode)
1998: Hale and Pace .... Roger the Lover (TV series, 1 episode)
2000: London's Burning .... Rico (TV series, 1 episode)
2002: Baddiel & Skinner Unplanned .... Viking (TV, 1 episode)
2004: Winner Takes All .... Stranger
2004: Audition .... John
2005: New Town Original .... Pete/Bodybuilder
2005: Hell to Pay .... Mike-stripper
2006: fIXers .... Klaus
2006: Are You Ready for Love? .... Mick
2007: Left Holding Baby .... Dad
2007: Stagknight .... Wolf
2008: Ten Dead Men .... Parker
2009: Three Pints of Beer .... Old Man
2009: 45 .... Jaden
2009: 31 North 62 East (also known as Too Close to the Truth) .... Private Frank Matthews
2009: A Geek Walks into a Pub .... Geek
2009: Scaranna .... James
2009: Hit the Big Time .... Cooper
2010: You Kill Me .... Bill
2011: 1000 Ways to Die .... Bar room Brawler
2011: Crossroads .... The Englishman
2011: Visible Scars .... James Photographer
2011: Futch Tube .... Mac (TV series in 4 episodes "Straight Shooter", "Shaken, Not...", "The Pilot" in 2 parts)
2011: L.A Paranormal .... John London
2012: Spanners .... Harry Anderson
2012: Courage, New Hampshire ...Captain Daniel Cressey
2013: Star Power ...Charles Burns
2013: Crossroads ...The Englishman
2013 Stay in the Car ... Jack
2013 Futch Tube …. Mac (TV series in 2 episodes “Bring on the babes” & “The killer cold”
2014 British Hustle …. Inspector Bradley Pooper
2014 Get Down …. Inspector Bradley Pooper / Himself (Music Video)
2015 The Bouncer …. Danny Martin
2015 The Immigration Game …. Hugh
2016 Amateurs …. Coach
2016 The Irrelevant …. The Captain
2016 The Life of Riley …. Daniel Cressy
2016 A Million Dead Presidents …. Gaggee Barks
2016 3riple B …. Hank
2017 CAll Me King …. Tuggs
2017 General Hospital (TV series 2 episodes) Kidnapper
2017 Whacksaw Fridge …. Sugar Tits
2018 Dunsingin …. Commander Cowell
2018 Star Power …. Charles Burn
2018 Rusty Pipes (Music Video) Will the Wheeler Dealer
2018 Meaning of Violence …. Kerwick
2018 Black Coffee …. Colin
2019 My Favourite Muff …. The Queen
2019 Head in a bag …. Colin
2020 Hot Like Hell …. Philip
2020 Get Your Gonads …. Gary’s Son
2021 Green Rush The Ultimate Strain …. Cooper

External links

John Campbell-Mac official website
 Facebook (https://www.facebook.com/pages/John-Campbell-Mac/328837833916597)
"Hit The Big Time" official website
Blood, Sweat And Too Many Tears official Myspace
Ten Dead Men official website

Living people
1973 births
English male film actors
English male television actors
People from Colchester
People from Canning Town